Karl Scatliffe (born 4 May 1967, Road Town, Tortola) is an athlete who represented the British Virgin Islands.

Scatliffe competed in the high jump at the 1992 Summer Olympics in Barcelona, he jumped 2.10 metres in the qualifying round and finished 21st in his pool and 39th overall so didn't qualify for the final.

References

Living people
1967 births
Athletes (track and field) at the 1991 Pan American Games
Athletes (track and field) at the 1992 Summer Olympics
Olympic athletes of the British Virgin Islands
Athletes (track and field) at the 1998 Commonwealth Games
Commonwealth Games competitors for the British Virgin Islands
Male high jumpers
British Virgin Islands male athletes
British Virgin Islands high jumpers
Pan American Games competitors for the British Virgin Islands